Callogaeana festiva, synonym Gaeana festiva, is a species of cicada in the tribe Gaeanini. It is found in East Asia from India and Bhutan to Indonesia.

References

External links

Images and original description of C. festiva on Cicada mania

Gaeanini
Insects described in 1803